Carlie C's is an IGA grocery store chain headquartered in Dunn, North Carolina.  It is the largest IGA franchise in North Carolina.  As of June 2019, the chain had 25 locations in the Raleigh-Fayetteville region of the state.  The business has annual revenue in excess of $100 million as of 2013.

The business started with a small country store in Johnston County, North Carolina opened by Carlie C. and Joyce McLamb in 1961.  It became part of the IGA in the 1980s.  By 1989, the chain had grown to six stores.  By 2011, it grew to 13 locations.

References

Supermarkets of the United States
Companies based in North Carolina
Retail companies established in 1961
1961 establishments in North Carolina